Glacial erratic boulders of Snohomish County are large glacial erratic boulders of rock which were moved to Snohomish County, Washington by glacial action during previous ice ages.

List of boulders

References

Further reading

External links
Washington glacial erratics project at University of Washington dept. of earth and space sciences

Landforms of Snohomish County, Washington
 Snohomish County